Andreas Voglsammer (born 9 January 1992) is a German professional footballer who plays as a forward for Championship club Millwall.

Club career
After playing in Bayern Munich's youth team, Voglsammer signed for Karlsruher SC in 2010, and made one 2. Bundesliga appearance for the club, as a substitute for Alexander Iashvili in a 2–0 defeat to VfL Bochum in October 2010. He left KSC at the end of the season, to sign for his hometown club, TSV 1860 Rosenheim, of fifth tier Bayernliga. After a fairly successful season there, he signed for 3. Liga side SpVgg Unterhaching in July 2012.

In January 2015, half a year before his contract with Unterhaching would have expired, he moved to 2. Bundesliga club 1. FC Heidenheim, signing until 2017. The transfer fee was believed to be about €200,000.

He was released on 19 January 2016 and moved to Arminia Bielefeld. In 2021, Voglsammer joined Union Berlin.

On 12 August 2022, Voglsammer signed for EFL Championship club Millwall for an undisclosed fee. He scored his first goal for the club in a 2-0 win over Watford on 26 December 2022.

International career
During April 2010 he earned three caps for Germany U-18, coming on as a substitute in all matches.

Career statistics

Honours 
Arminia Bielefeld

 2. Bundesliga Champions: 2019–20

References

External links
 
 

1992 births
Living people
People from Rosenheim
Sportspeople from Upper Bavaria
Association football forwards
German footballers
Germany youth international footballers
SpVgg Unterhaching players
Karlsruher SC players
TSV 1860 Rosenheim players
1. FC Heidenheim players
Arminia Bielefeld players
1. FC Union Berlin players
Millwall F.C. players
Bundesliga players
2. Bundesliga players
3. Liga players
Footballers from Bavaria
Expatriate footballers in England
German expatriate footballers
German expatriate sportspeople in England